The Eastern Cape Provincial Legislature is the primary legislative body of the South African province of Eastern Cape. It is unicameral in its composition, and elects the premier and the provincial cabinet from among the members of the leading party or coalition in the parliament.

Powers
The Eastern Cape Provincial Legislature elects the Premier of the Eastern Cape and can force the Premier to resign by passing a motion of no confidence. Even though the Executive Council of the province is appointed by the Premier, the legislature can pass a motion of no confidence forcing the Premier to reconfigure the Council. The provincial legislature also designates that Eastern Cape's delegates to the National Council of Provinces, assigning delegates to parties in proportion to the total number of seats each party holds in the legislature.

The legislature has the power to pass legislation in numerous fields set forth in the national constitution; in some fields, the legislative power is shared with the national parliament, while in others it is reserved to the province. The fields include matters such as health, education, agriculture, housing, environmental protection, and development planning.

The legislature supervises the administration of the Eastern Cape provincial government, and the Premier of the Eastern Cape and the members of the Executive Council are required to report to the legislature on the performance of their individual responsibilities. The legislature also manages the pecuniary matters of the provincial government by way of the appropriation bills which determine the provincial budget.

Election 
The provincial legislature consists of 63 members, who are elected through a system of party list proportional representation with closed lists. In other words, each voter casts a vote for one political party, and seats in the legislature are allocated to the parties in proportion to the number of votes received. The seats are then filled by members in accordance with lists submitted by the parties before the election.

The legislature is elected for a term of five years unless it is dissolved early. This may occur if the legislature votes to dissolve and it is at least three years since the last election, or if the Premiership falls vacant and the legislature fails to elect a new Premier within ninety days. By convention, all nine provincial legislatures and the National Assembly are elected on the same day.

The most recent election was held on 8 May 2019. The following table summarises the results.

The following table shows the composition of the provincial parliament after past elections.

Officers
The Speaker is the political head of the legislature and is assisted by a Deputy Speaker. The current Speaker is Helen Sauls-August and the Deputy Speaker is Mlibo Qoboshiyane; they are both members of the African National Congress (ANC). The following people have served as Speaker:

Members

References

External links
 ECPL

Government of the Eastern Cape
Provincial legislatures of South Africa
Unicameral legislatures